The 2018 Rugby Europe Sevens Trophy is the second division of Rugby Europe's 2018 sevens season. This edition was hosted by the cities of Zagreb and Šiauliai from 7 June to 1 July, with the winner promoted to the 2019 Grand Prix and the two teams with the fewest points relegated to 2019 Conference 1.

Schedule

Standings

Zagreb

Was held 8–9 June.

Pool Stage

Pool A

Pool B

Pool C

Knockout stage

Challenge Trophy

5th Place

Cup

Šiauliai

Will be held 30 June – 1 July.

Pool Stage

Pool A

Pool B

Pool C

Knockout stage

Challenge Trophy

5th Place

Cup

External links
 Tournament page

References

Trophy
2018 rugby sevens competitions
2018 in Croatian sport
2018 in Lithuanian sport